George Thomas Bradshaw (September 12, 1924 – November 4, 1994) was an American professional baseball player, a catcher who appeared in ten Major League games for the  Washington Senators.

Bradshaw's professional career began in 1946, and prior to his callup to Washington, took place mostly in the Class D North Carolina State League, where he served as a playing manager from 1950 through mid-1952 and in 1954. The 1952 season saw the 27-year-old Bradshaw rise from Class D to the Class B Charlotte Hornets in mid-year. He batted .324 in the Tri-State League and was recalled to the Senators in August.  In his Major League debut, he singled in four at bats against the Philadelphia Athletics and made an error in the field.  Six days later, also against Philadelphia, Bradshaw had his best MLB game, with two hits in four at-bats, including a double and three runs batted in.

Bradshaw logged 23 Major League at bats with the Senators; his five hits included two doubles. He returned to the minor leagues in 1953 and 1954, before leaving baseball after nine pro seasons.

References

External links

1924 births
1994 deaths
Baseball players from North Carolina
Charlotte Hornets (baseball) players
Chattanooga Lookouts players
Greenville Spinners players
Knoxville Smokies players
Landis Millers players
Major League Baseball catchers
People from Salisbury, North Carolina
Pueblo Dodgers players
Statesville Owls players
Trois-Rivières Royals players
Valdosta Dodgers players
Washington Senators (1901–1960) players
Morganton Aggies players